Chun Chil-sung (Hangul: 전칠성, Hanja: 全七星; born July 7, 1961, in Sinan, Jeollanam-do, South Korea) is a retired South Korean boxer.

Amateur career
Chun managed a career record of 100-6 during his amateur career.

In 1983, Chun won the silver medal in lightweight (–60 kg) at the 3rd Boxing World Cup in Rome, Italy. He defeated 1983 European lightweight champion Emil Chuprenski of Bulgaria in the semifinal bout.

Next year, he won the bronze medal in the lightweight division at the 1984 Summer Olympics in Los Angeles, California. In the semifinals he was defeated by eventual winner Pernell Whitaker of the United States by 0-5 unanimous decision, but this is considered one of the controversial pro-American jury decisions in the boxing competitions at the 1984 Olympics.

Results
1983 Boxing World Cup

1984 Summer Olympics

Pro career

In 1986 Chun turned professional. He was the first South Korean Olympic medalist boxer to turn pro since 1968 Olympic bronze medalist Chang Kyou-chul.

Chun defeated former two-time WBC Super Featherweight champion Rafael Limón in 1989. After going 18–1, he was matched up against Joey Gamache for the WBA Lightweight title in Portland, Maine in 1992, but was defeated by 9-round TKO. After the bout, he retired from boxing.

External links

1961 births
Living people
Boxers at the 1984 Summer Olympics
Lightweight boxers
Olympic boxers of South Korea
Olympic bronze medalists for South Korea
Olympic medalists in boxing
Sportspeople from South Jeolla Province
South Korean male boxers
Medalists at the 1984 Summer Olympics